The 1952 Arkansas State Indians football team was an American football team that represented Arkansas State College—now known as Arkansas State University—as an independent during the 1952 college football season. Led by seventh-year head coach Forrest England, the Indians compiled a record of 8–3. They were invited to the Refrigerator Bowl, where they lost to Western Kentucky.

Schedule

References

Arkansas State
Arkansas State Red Wolves football seasons
Arkansas State Indians football